Amourrichio Jahvairo Déshauntino van Axel Dongen (born 29 September 2004) is a Dutch professional footballer who plays as a forward for Eerste Divisie team Jong Ajax.

Club career
Born in Almere, Van Axel Dongen played youth football for Zeeburgia and OSV Amsterdam before joining the youth academy of Ajax. He signed his first professional contract with the club in September 2020. He made his professional debut for Jong Ajax as a starter on 7 May 2021 in a 1–1 draw against De Graafschap, playing until halftime for the team led by Mitchell van der Gaag. The following matchday, which was also the final of the season, he also appeared as a starter in a 1–2 away win over Telstar. Shortly before the break, Van Axel Dongen scored the opening goal after an assist by Kian Fitz-Jim, and he was substituted in the 62nd minute for Nordin Musampa. At the end of the 2020–21 season, Van Axel Dongen was awarded the Abdelhak Nouri trophy as the best talent of Ajax's youth academy that season.

International career
Born in the Netherlands, van Axel Dongen is of Surinamese descent. He is a current Dutch youth international.

Career statistics

Club

Honours
Ajax
 Eredivisie: 2021–22

Individual
 Ajax Talent of the Future (Abdelhak Nouri Trophy): 2020–21

References

External links
 
 National team under-16 profile 
 National team under-18 profile 

2004 births
Living people
Footballers from Almere
Association football forwards
Dutch footballers
Dutch sportspeople of Surinamese descent
Netherlands youth international footballers
Eerste Divisie players
Eredivisie players
Jong Ajax players
AFC Ajax players